Yui Kamiji defeated the defending champion Aniek van Koot in the final, 6–3, 6–3 to win the women's singles wheelchair tennis title at the 2014 US Open.

Seeds

Draw

Bracket

External links 

 Draw

Wheelchair Women's Singles
U.S. Open, 2014 Women's Singles